Carlos Fernando Terry (June 22, 1956 – March 12, 1989) was an American professional basketball shooting guard who spent three seasons in the National Basketball Association (NBA) with the Washington Bullets. He played college basketball at Winston-Salem State University.

Early years
Terry attended Lexington Senior High School. He accepted a basketball scholarship from then-Division II Winston-Salem State University, to play under legendary coach Clarence "Big House" Gaines. As a freshman, he was the team's sixth man. As a sophomore, he was named a starter at forward.

As a senior, he averaged 20.9 points and 10.7 rebounds per game, while leading the team to the 1977 CIAA Men’s Basketball Championship. He received CIAA Player of the Year and CIAA All-Tournament Team honors.

He appeared in 115 games, averaging 18.7 points and 11.8 rebounds. He finished as the school's all-time leader in rebounds (1,467) and ranked third in points scored (2,151). 

In 2001, he was inducted into the WSSU C.E. “Big House” Gaines Athletic Hall of Fame. In 2005, he was inducted into the CIAA 60th Anniversary All-Tournament team. In 2009, he was inducted into the CIAA Athletic Hall of Fame. He was named one of the CIAA's "60 Greatest Players".

Professional career
Terry was selected by Los Angeles Lakers in the fifth round (104 overall) of the 1978 NBA Draft. He was played at center in the summer league and struggled before being cut on September 14, 1978. 

He then took his talents to the Philippine Basketball Association (PBA) where he played for the popular Toyota team, which he led to a conference championship (1978 PBA Invitational Conference).

In 1978, he signed with the Allentown Jets in the Continental Basketball Association, missing seven weeks of the season when he got hit in the mouth by an opponent elbow that broke his jaw.

On September 8, 1980, after tryouts with a half dozen NBA teams, he was signed as a free agent by the Washington Bullets. He averaged 7.2 points and 4.5 rebounds per game, suffering a torn cruciate ligament in his left knee and was placed on the injured reserve list.

In the 1981-82 season, he contributed the Bullets qualifying for the playoffs and reaching the East Conference Semifinals. He was released on October 28, 1982. He was re-signed on November 16. Although he measured at 6 feet 5, he played center and forward for three seasons. He wasn't re-signed after the season.

In October 1983, he signed with the Louisville Catbirds of the Continental Basketball Association, before being released on November 20. On November 22, 1983, he signed with the Albuquerque Silvers of the Continental Basketball Association.

Personal life
After his playing career was abruptly done, Terry's life was never the same when alcoholism and drugs took over. On January 12, 1989, he was convicted on two counts of cocaine distribution and one count of conspiracy to distribute cocaine. 

On March 12, 1989, just two months later at the age of 32, he was killed in a high-speed car crash on the Capital Beltway in Prince George's County, Maryland. Police said that Terry had been drinking and was speeding. On March 21, he was scheduled for sentencing in Prince George's County Circuit Court after, where he was facing a maximum of 20 years in prison and a $250,000 fine on each count.

Terry was a member of the Kappa chapter of Iota Phi Theta.

References

External links
 

1956 births
1989 deaths
Albuquerque Silvers players
Allentown Jets players
American expatriate basketball people in the Philippines
American men's basketball players
Basketball players from North Carolina
Lehigh Valley Jets players
Los Angeles Lakers draft picks
People from Lexington, North Carolina
Philippine Basketball Association imports
Road incident deaths in Maryland
Shooting guards
Toyota Super Corollas players
Washington Bullets players
Winston-Salem State Rams men's basketball players